The title of Duc de La Force, pair de France, in the peerage of France, was created in 1637 for members of the Caumont family, who were lords of the village of La Force in the Dordogne.

The family originated as Lord of Caumont (Seigneur de Caumont) in the early 11th century and were subsequently raised in rank over the following centuries.

The family is Protestant : the father (François de Caumont) and brother of the first Duke were killed in the St. Bartholomew's Day Massacre (1572). Afterwards the family served the king loyally on the battlefield, but remained Protestant.

Armand de Caumont died in [1755] on the battlefield at Cuneo on 30 September, at the age of 23. Afterwards, the dukedom passed to a distant relative of the main line, Bertrand (1724–1773), then to his son, Louis-Joseph Nompar (1768–1838) and to his descendants. In 1909, the great-great grandson of Louis-Joseph, Armand-Joseph (1878–1961), took the title of Duke of La Force. There are La Force and LeForce families in the United Kingdom, United States, Canada and Portugal descendant of the French family.

Lord of Caumont (from father to son)
 Calo I (c. 1050), 1st lord of Caumont
 Geoffrey I, 2nd lord of Caumont
 Calo II, 3rd lord of Caumont. He participated in the First Crusade.
 Dodon, 4th lord of Caumont
 Sanchez, 5th lord of Caumont
 Richard, 6th lord of Caumont, had two sons, including Nompar, Lord of Lauzun
 Begon, 7th lord of Caumont
 William I, 8th lord of Caumont
 William II, 9th lord of Caumont

Lord of Caumont, Samazan and Montpuillan (father to son)
 Bertrand, son of William II, 9th lord of Caumont. 10th lord of Caumont, 1st lord of Samazan and Montpuillan
 William III, 11th lord of Caumont, 2nd lord of Samazan and Montpuillan
 William-Raymond I, 12th lord of Caumont, 3rd lord of Samazan and Montpuillan
 Nompar I, 13th lord of Caumont, 4th lord of Samazan and Montpuillan

Lord of Caumont, Samazan, Montpuillan, Castelnau and Berbiguires
 William-Raymond II (d. 1418), son of Nompar I, 13th lord of Caumont, 4th lord of Samazan and Montpuillan. 14th lord of Caumont, 5th lord of Samazan and Montpuillan, 1st lord of Castelnau and Berbiguires
Nompar II, son of Raymond II, lord of Caumont, Castelnau, Castelculier and Berbiguières

Lord of Castelnau
 Brandelis, son of William-Raymond II. 2nd lord of Castelnau
 Charles I, 3rd lord of Castelnau
 Charles II (d. 1627), 4th lord of Castelnau
 Francis (killed in the St. Bartholomew's Day Massacre), 5th lord of Castelnau

Duc de La Force, Pair de France (1637-1699) 
 Jacques-Nompar de Caumont, duc de La Force, (1558–1652), marshal of France
 Armand-Nompar de Caumont, duc de La Force, (1580?-1675), son and marshal of France
 Henri-Nompar de Caumont, duc de La Force, (1582–1678), brother
 Jacques-Nompar II de Caumont, duc de La Force, (1630?-1699), grandson

Duc de La Force, Comte de Mussidan, Baron de Castelnau, Caumont, Tonneins et Samazan (1699-1773)

 Henri-Jacques Nompar de Caumont, duc de La Force, (1675–1726), son  and Member of the Académie française
 Armand-Nompar II de Caumont, duc de La Force, (1679–1764), brother
 Jacques-Nompar III de Caumont, duc de La Force, (1714–1755), son

Marquis puis Duc de La Force, Pair de France (1773-1838)
 Louis-Joseph Nompar, Marquis then duc de La Force in 1787 (1768–1838)

Duc de La Force (pour le deuxieme fois) (1839-Present)
 François Pierre Bertrand Nompar de Caumont, 9th duc de La Force (1772–1854)
 Auguste de Caumont, 10th duc de La Force (1803–1882)
 Oliver Emmanuel de Caumont, 11th duc de La Force (1839–1909)
 Auguste de Caumont, 12th duc de La Force (1878–1961)
 Jacques de Caumont La Force, 13th duc de La Force (1912-1985)
 Henri Jacques Nompar de Caumont La Force (1944 -), 14th duc de La Force

Other homonym families 
(This family is different from the branch Busquet de Chandoisel de Caumont , or Busquet de Caumont de Marivault  originating from Normandy.)

Sources
Family tree of the Caumont family (French)
History of the Caumont family (French)

 
Noble titles created in 1637